"Won't Stand Down" is a song by British rock band Muse. Released as a single on 13 January 2022, it is their first single from Will of the People, their ninth studio album. It topped the UK Rock & Metal chart and reached number 56 on the UK Singles Chart. The song was a sleeper hit in the United States, reaching number 1 on Billboards Mainstream Rock Airplay chart in May 2022, becoming the first Muse song to do so.

Release
On 25 December 2021, Muse lead singer and guitarist Matt Bellamy held a brief livestream on the official Muse Instagram account. In the video, he can be seen driving his Tesla on Autopilot mode, with his 10-year-old son Bing in the passenger seat. The pair are listening (and, in Bing's case, headbanging) to a then-unreleased Muse song, entitled "Won't Stand Down" on the car stereo screen, while Matt provides occasional commentary over the track. In total, the livestream previewed a roughly one-minute-long section of the song. Muse's own Instagram account hinted towards the release of a new single in a post on 31 December, initially uploaded with the caption "Looking forward to WSD. We'll see you on the other side!" before "WSD" was changed to "2022" after a few minutes.

The release of "Won't Stand Down" as a single was officially confirmed by Muse on 7 January 2022, with the release date set for 13 January on all digital platforms. On 9 January, a further snippet of the song, this time consisting of the opening verse, was posted to Muse's TikTok account as well as a "Won't Stand Down"-themed Instagram Stories mask filter.

Writing and composition
Musically, the song has been described as heavy metal, hard rock, and electronic rock. Prior to release, the song was described as Muse's "heaviest material yet", featuring a metalcore breakdown. The song also contains "heavy guitars and industrial-like distortions", and "triplet-flow-type vocals in the verse".

According to vocalist and guitarist Matt Bellamy, "'Won't Stand Down' is a song about standing your ground against bullies, whether that be on the playground, at work or anywhere."

Artwork and music video
The digital artwork for "Won't Stand Down" was described as "dark and ominous", featuring a hooded priest-like figure hovering over ten disciples, figures wearing digital-style masks and gothic chandeliers. A short teaser of the music video was posted to Muse's TikTok account on 9 January.

Personnel
Credits adapted from Tidal

Muse
Matt Bellamy – lead vocals, guitars, keyboards, production
Chris Wolstenholme – bass, backing vocals, production
Dominic Howard – drums, production

Production
Aleks Von Korff – additional production, engineering
Dan Lancaster – mixing
Chris Gehringer – mastering
Rhys May – mixing assistant
Andy Maxwell  – studio assistant
Joe Devenney – studio assistant
Tommy Bosustow – studio assistant
Chris Whitemyer – technical assistant
Paul Warren – technical assistant

Charts

Weekly charts

Year-end charts

Awards and nominations

Release history

References

2022 singles
2022 songs
Muse (band) songs
Songs written by Matt Bellamy
British heavy metal songs
British hard rock songs
Electronic rock songs
Metalcore songs